The Powers Girl, sometimes retitled Hello, Beautiful, is a 1943 musical comedy film about women employed by John Robert Powers' modeling agency. Starring George Murphy, Anne Shirley, and Carole Landis, the film was directed by Norman Z. McLeod and based upon the book by John Robert Powers (played by Alan Mowbray in the film).

It was filmed during the height of the Big Band era and features Benny Goodman and His Orchestra. Vocalist Peggy Lee sings with the band in an unbilled appearance during one sequence.

Cast
George Murphy as Jerry Hendricks
Anne Shirley as Ellen Evans
Carole Landis as Kay Evans
Dennis Day as himself
Benny Goodman as himself
Alan Mowbray as John Robert Powers
Peggy Lee as herself (uncredited)
Jean Ames as Googie
Mary Treen as Nancy
Rafael Storm as Vandy Vandegrift
Helen MacKellar as Mrs. Hendricks
Harry Shannon as Mr. Hendricks
Roseanne Murray as Edna Lambert
Jayne Hazard as Model in Waiting Room
Lillian Eggers as Model
Linda Stirling as Model
Evelyn Frey as Model
Eloise Hart as Model
Patricia Mace as Model
Barbara Slater as Model
Rosemary Coleman as Model
Edna Johnson as Model
Rebel Randall as Model
Teala Loring as Model (billed as Judith Gibson)

References

External links

1943 films
1943 musical comedy films
American black-and-white films
American musical comedy films
Films directed by Norman Z. McLeod
Films scored by Louis Silvers
Films set in New York City
United Artists films
1940s English-language films
1940s American films